Ambada is a census town in Chhindwara district  in the state of Madhya Pradesh, India.

Demographics
 India census, Ambada had a population of 6,895. Males constitute 54% of the population and females 46%. Ambada has an average literacy rate of 70%, higher than the national average of 59.5%; with 60% of the males and 40% of females literate. 8% of the population is under 6 years of age.

References

Cities and towns in Chhindwara district